The America Zone was one of the two regional zones of the 1939 International Lawn Tennis Challenge.

7 teams entered the America Zone: 6 teams entered the North & Central America Zone, while 1 team entered the South America Zone. The winner of each sub-zone would play against each other to determine who moved to the Inter-Zonal Final to compete against the winner of the Europe Zone.

Australia defeated Cuba in the North & Central America Zone final, and then received a walkover in the Americas Inter-Zonal final after Brazil, the only team in the South America Zone, withdrew. Australia went on to face Yugoslavia in the Inter-Zonal Final.

North & Central America Zone

Draw

Quarterfinals

Mexico vs. Australia

Cuba vs. Canada

Semifinals

Australia vs. Philippines

Final

Cuba vs. Australia

Americas Inter-Zonal Final
Australia defeated Brazil by walkover.

Notes

References

External links
Davis Cup official website

Davis Cup Americas Zone
America Zone
International Lawn Tennis Challenge